Steven D Grossman (September 1, 1951, in Brooklyn, New York – June 23, 1991, in San Francisco, California) was a singer-songwriter from the early 1970s whose debut (and until 2011 only) album Caravan Tonight (1974) is distinguished as being the first album dealing with openly gay themes and subject matter to be released on a major label (Mercury Records). 
Stephen Holden of Rolling Stone hailed it as "one of the most auspicious singer-songwriter debuts of the '70s."

Grossman was heavily influenced by Joni Mitchell and the album is very much in the style of singer-songwriter Cat Stevens, as opposed to the then-current glam Bowiesque fashion of openly gay artists such as Jobriath.  Performers on the album included Eric Weissberg, best known for his recording "Dueling Banjos" for the 1972 movie Deliverance.

Grossman died in 1991, aged 39, of an AIDS-related illness. Caravan Tonight has yet to be released on CD although a cover version of the title track by model and occasional singer Twiggy has. Singer-songwriter Mark Weigle created a duet of "Out" with Steven Grossman on his Out of the Loop CD in 2002.

Grossman recorded a second album shortly before his death and this was finally released on CD in 2011 entitled Something in the Moonlight.

Discography 
 Caravan Tonight (1974)
 Something in the Moonlight (2011)

References

External links
 http://www.queermusicheritage.com/grossman.html
 http://www.queermusicheritage.com/GROSSMAN/grossmanLP1.mp3
 https://www.youtube.com/watch?v=c5YKADrQcvY
 https://www.youtube.com/watch?v=zfGZnutsqH0

1951 births
1991 deaths
AIDS-related deaths in California
American folk singers
American male singer-songwriters
American gay musicians
LGBT people from New York (state)
American LGBT singers
American LGBT songwriters
Singers from New York City
Musicians from Brooklyn
Gay singers
Gay songwriters
20th-century American male singers
20th-century American singers
20th-century American LGBT people
Singer-songwriters from New York (state)
American gay writers